The Society of Russian Dramatists and Opera Composers was an organisation launched in 1874 in Moscow with a view to defending the rights of the authors of music and drama in Russia.

History
The Assembly of Russian Writers, as it was originally called, was founded on 28 November 1870 by a group of authors who gathered at the place of the translator Vladimir Rodislavsky, initially to find the means for preventing works from being produced on theatre stage without their authors' permission. By the time it was launched officially on 21 October 1874, the organisation included 81 members, among them Alexander Ostrovsky, A.K. Tolstoy, Nikolai Nekrasov, Nikolai Leskov, Mikhail Saltykov-Shchedrin, Ivan Turgenev, Grigory Danilevsky and Pyotr Boborykin. 

Ostrovsky was elected its first chairman, Rodislavsky its secretary. After Ostrovsky's death, he was succeeded by first Sergey Yuriev, then Apollon Maykov (the slavist, not to be confused with the renowned poet) and Ippolit Shpazhinsky. In October 1875 a group of composers led by Nikolai Rimsky-Korsakov joined in, and the organization's name was changed to the Society of Russian Dramatists and Opera Composers. In 1887 Anton Chekhov, Vladimir Nemirovich-Danchenko and Dmitry Mamin-Sibiryak became its members.

In 1904 the Society split into the Moscow and Petersburg sections. Both functioned separately up until 1925 when, re-organized, they merged again into the Union of the Drama and Music Writers (Союз драматических и музыкальных писателей).

References

Copyright collection societies
Music licensing organizations
Russian writers' organizations
Arts organizations established in 1874
Organizations disestablished in 1904
1904 disestablishments in the Russian Empire
Music organizations based in Russia